
The following lists events that happened during 1856 in South Africa.

Events
 Approximately 3000 Crimean War veterans (German Legionnaires) settled in Kaffraria, later joined by 2700 German civilians.
 February - U.G. Lauts dismissed as consul of the Orange Free State in the Netherlands
 15 July - Natal is made a separate British colony, after being part of Cape colony since 1843 
 13 October - State President Boshoff of the Orange Free State lays the foundation stone of Grey College in Bloemfontein
 17 December - The Boer republic of Lydenburg is established
 The Battle of Ndondakusuka: Mpande's sons Mbuyazwe and Cetshwayo battle for kingship of Zululand. Cetshwayo is successful, and 23,000 Zulu die.

Births
 26 March - Christiaan Willem Hendrik van der Post, member of the Orange Free State Volksraad and poet, is born in Leiden, Netherlands

References

See Years in South Africa for list of References

Years in South Africa